Marujupu Peak; Fosdick Mountains, Ford Ranges, Marie Byrd Land, Antarctica. A conspicuous nunatak standing above the main flow of Ochs Glacier, between Mount Iphigene and Mount Ferranto. It was discovered and so named by Byrd on the Byrd Antarctic Expedition flight of December 5, 1929. Marujupu combines the letters from the names of three daughters and a son of Mr. and Mrs. Arthur Sulzberger. The daughters are Marian, Ruth, and Judy; Punch is the nickname of son Arthur. The Sulzbergers were patrons of the expedition.

References

 
Mountain ranges of Marie Byrd Land
Nunataks of Antarctica